O-phosphoseryl-tRNASec kinase (PSTK, phosphoseryl-tRNA[Ser]Sec kinase, phosphoseryl-tRNASec kinase) is an enzyme with systematic name ATP:L-seryl-tRNASec O-phosphotransferase. This enzyme catalyses the following chemical reaction

 ATP + L-seryl-tRNASec  ADP + O-phospho-L-seryl-tRNASec

In archaea and eukarya selenocysteine formation is achieved by a two-step process.

References

External links 
 

EC 2.7.1